Karl Christer Fursth (born 6 July 1970) is a Swedish former professional footballer who played as a left midfielder.

He represented Örebro SK, Helsingborgs IF, 1. FC Köln, and Hammarby IF during a career that spanned between 1988 and 2003. A full international between 1992 and 1995, he won four caps for the Sweden national team. He also represented the Sweden Olympic team at the 1992 Summer Olympics in Barcelona, Spain.

Honours 
Hammarby IF
 Allsvenskan: 2001

References

External links

1970 births
Living people
Sportspeople from Örebro
Swedish footballers
Association football midfielders
Sweden international footballers
Sweden under-21 international footballers
Sweden youth international footballers
Olympic footballers of Sweden
Footballers at the 1992 Summer Olympics
Allsvenskan players
Bundesliga players
1. FC Köln players
Helsingborgs IF players
Örebro SK players
Hammarby Fotboll players
Swedish expatriate footballers
Swedish expatriate sportspeople in Germany
Expatriate footballers in Germany